Max Friediger (9 April 1884 – 9 April 1947) was a Danish chief rabbi and a survivor of the Holocaust.

Biography
After the occupation of Denmark by the Wehrmacht, Friediger and other high prominent Danish Jews were interned in 1943 in the open state prison at Horserød camp, and later deported to Theresienstadt concentration camp via Swinemünde where on 3 October 1943 he and other Danish Jews were spotted by Danish communists also being deported. Friediger led the church register of approx. 480 Danish Jews in a synagogue located in a storeroom within the camp and later published an account of life in Theresienstadt.

After his death in 1947, his successor as chief rabbi was Marcus Melchior.

References 

Chief rabbis of Denmark
Theresienstadt Ghetto survivors
Danish people of World War II
Danish Jews
1884 births
1947 deaths